Peter Gorski, (7 September 1921 – 3 March 2007) was a German film director.

Early life
Peter Gorski was born in Berlin, and was adopted in 1949 by the famous German actor Gustaf Gründgens.

Career
Gorski started his career in 1955 as the assistant director for the film Ripening Youth.

In 1960 Gorski directed the film Faust, based on Goethe's Faust and adapted from the theater production at the Deutsches Schauspielhaus in Hamburg. The film starred his adoptive father Gustaf Gründgens as Mephistopheles, and was chosen as West Germany's official submission to the 33rd Academy Awards for Best Foreign Language Film, but did not manage to receive a nomination. The film also won Gorski a Deutscher Filmpreis for an Outstanding Documentary or Cultural Film in 1961.

Lawsuit
In 1968, Peter Gorski, as Gustaf Gründgens’ sole heir, sued the Nymphenburger Verlagsbuchhandlung which had published the novel Mephisto, which was loosely based on the life of his adoptive father. The Federal Constitutional Court of Germany ruled that Gründgens’ personal freedom was more important than the freedom of art.

Filmography
 Faust (1960), as director
 Reifende Jugend (1955), as assistant director

References

External links
 

1921 births
2007 deaths
Artists from Berlin
Film directors from Berlin